Chas may refer to:


Places 
 Chas, Puy-de-Dôme, a commune in central France
 Chas, a city in Jharkhand, India
 Chas block, an administrative division in Jharkhand, India
 Chas, Khed, a panchayat village in Maharashtra, India
 Capitol Hill Autonomous Zone (CHAZ or CHOP), a self-declared autonomous zone in the Capitol Hill neighborhood of Seattle, Washington in the United States in 2020.

Newspapers 
 Chas (newspaper), a Russian-language newspaper in Latvia

People 
 Chas (given name), a list of people
 Chas Smash, stage name of English singer-songwriter and multi-instrumentalist Cathal Joseph Smyth (born 1959)

Fictional characters
 Frank Chas Chandler (comics), a supporting character in the Hellblazer comic series and the main character of Hellblazer Presents: Chas – The Knowledge
 Chastity Chas Dingle, on the British soap opera Emmerdale

See also
 Parque Chas, a district of Buenos Aires, Argentina
 Chaz (disambiguation)